The Bosnian-Herzegovinian Patriotic Party (BPS) is Bosnian nationalist political party in Bosnia and Herzegovina. It was founded by the former commander of the Army of the Republic of Bosnia and Herzegovina, Sefer Halilović.

In 1998 it became a party involved in the Parliament of the Federation of Bosnia and Herzegovina.

Elections

Parliamentary elections

Presidency elections

References

External links
Official website 

Bosniak political parties in Bosnia and Herzegovina
Bosnian nationalism